Razafindrakoto is a surname of Malagasy origin that may refer to:
Elysé Razafindrakoto (born 1974), retired Malagasy football defender
Francette Razafindrakoto Harifanja, Malagasy politician
Mamisoa Razafindrakoto (born 1974), Malagasy former footballer
Victor Razafindrakoto (born 1972), Malagasy long-distance runner
Surnames of Malagasy origin
Malagasy-language surnames